The Jew of Linz is a 1998 book by Australian writer Kimberley Cornish, in which the author alleges that the Austrian philosopher Ludwig Wittgenstein had a profound effect on Adolf Hitler when they were both pupils at the Realschule (lower secondary school) in Linz, Austria, in the early 1900s. Cornish also alleges that Wittgenstein was involved in the Cambridge Five Soviet spy ring during the Second World War.

Contents

Summary
The occasion for Adolf Hitler becoming anti-Semitic was a schoolboy interaction in Linz, circa 1904, with Ludwig Wittgenstein.
In the 1920s, Wittgenstein joined the Comintern.
As a Trinity College don, and a member of the Cambridge Apostles, Wittgenstein recruited fellow Apostles Guy Burgess, Kim Philby and Anthony Blunt, all students at Trinity—as well as Donald Maclean from nearby Trinity Hall—to work for the Soviet Union.
Wittgenstein was responsible for the secret of decrypting the German "Enigma" code being passed to Joseph Stalin, which resulted ultimately in the Nazi defeats on the Eastern Front and liberation of the surviving Jews from the camps.
Both Hitler's oratory and Wittgenstein's philosophy of language derive from the hermetic tradition, the key to which is Wittgenstein's "no-ownership" theory of mind, described by P. F. Strawson in his book Individuals (1958).

Realschule
Cornish used a school photograph from the Realschule (lower secondary school) in Linz, Austria, on his book cover. That boy in the top-right corner is undisputedly Hitler (see above right). Cornish alleges that Wittgenstein is the boy on the bottom left; he says the Victoria Police photographic evidence unit in Australia examined the photograph and confirmed that it was "highly probable" the boy is Wittgenstein.  German government
and U.S. sources
date the photograph to 1901, slightly after Hitler's arrival at the school, but two years prior to Wittgenstein's enrollment. 

Wittgenstein and Hitler both attended the Linz Realschule, a state school of about 300 students, and were there at the same time only from 1903 to 1904, according to Wittgenstein's biographers. While Hitler was just six days older than Wittgenstein, they were two grades apart at the school—Hitler was repeating a year and Wittgenstein had been advanced a year. Cornish's thesis is not only that Hitler knew the young Wittgenstein, but that he hated him, and that Wittgenstein was specifically the one Jewish boy from his school days referred to in Mein Kampf. The last claim referred to the following quote:

Cornish argues further that Hitler's anti-Semitism involved a projection of the young Wittgenstein's traits onto the whole Jewish people. Wittgenstein did have three Jewish grandparents but Wittgenstein himself, and his mother and father, were Roman Catholics.

The Cambridge Five
Cornish also argues that Wittgenstein is the most likely suspect as recruiter of the "Cambridge Five" spy ring.  The author suggests that Wittgenstein was responsible for British decryption technology for the German Enigma code reaching the Red Army and that he thereby enabled the Red Army victories on the Eastern Front that liberated the camps and ultimately overthrew the Reich.

He writes that the Soviet government offered Wittgenstein the chair in philosophy at what had been Lenin's university (Kazan) at a time (during the Great Purge) when ideological conformity was at a premium amongst Soviet academics and enforced by the very harshest penalties. Wittgenstein wanted to emigrate to Russia, first in the twenties, as he wrote in a letter to Paul Engelmann, and again in the thirties, either to work as a labourer or as a philosophy lecturer. Cornish argues that given the nature of the Soviet regime, the possibility that a non-Marxist philosopher (or even one over whom the government could exert no ideological control) would be offered such a post, is unlikely in the extreme.

No-ownership theory of mind
Other sections of the book deal with Cornish's theories about what he claims are the common roots of Wittgenstein's and Hitler's philosophies in mysticism, magic, and the "no-ownership" theory of mind. Cornish sees this as Wittgenstein's generalisation of Arthur Schopenhauer's account of the Unity of the Will, in which despite appearances, there is only a single Will acting through the bodies of all creatures. This doctrine, generalized to other mental faculties such as thinking, is presented in Ralph Waldo Emerson's "Essays". The doctrine, writes Cornish, was also held by the Oxford philosopher R. G. Collingwood who was one of Wittgenstein's electors to his Cambridge chair. Cornish tries to tie this to Wittgenstein's arguments against the idea of "mental privacy" and in conclusion says "I have attempted to locate the source of the Holocaust in a perversion of early Aryan religious doctrines about the ultimate nature of man". Cornish also suggests that Hitler's oratorical powers in addressing the group mind of crowds and Wittgenstein's philosophy of language and denial of mental privacy, are the practical and theoretical consequences of this doctrine.

Reception
The  book proved controversial, with reviewers criticizing it for drawing unwarranted connections between disparate events. The main criticisms were that:

 Cornish's evidence is contentious.
 Hitler and Wittgenstein did attend the same school at the same time, but there is little evidence that they knew each other.
 There is no evidence that there was a personal antagonism between them, or that Hitler's dislike of Wittgenstein shaped the course of Nazi anti-Semitism.
 Despite the wealth of material which has emerged from the archives of the KGB since the collapse of the Soviet Union, there is no evidence that Wittgenstein was amongst the higher-level Soviet spies in the UK, or that he was a Soviet agent, or that he had pro-Soviet sympathies at all. 
 Cornish misrepresents Wittgenstein's thought and his philosophical context, or simply does not understand him.

One of the main issues of contention is the claim that Wittgenstein triggered or substantially contributed to Hitler's antisemitism while they were at school together. It is a view that has some support. British professor Laurence Goldstein, in his Clear and Queer Thinking: Wittgenstein's Development and His Relevance to Modern Thought (1999), called Cornish's book important, writing: "For one thing, at the K.u.k. Realschule in Linz, Wittgenstein met Hitler and may have inspired in him a hatred of Jews which led, ultimately, to the Holocaust. This, naturally enough, weighed heavily on Wittgenstein's conscience in his later years ... It is overwhelmingly probable that Hitler and Wittgenstein did meet, and with dire consequences for the history of the world."

Reviewing Goldstein's own book, Mary McGinn called it a sloppy and irresponsible argument: "[O]ne is amazed at the sheer looseness of thought that allows him to assert that 'at certain points in Mein Kampf where Hitler seems to be raging against Jews in general it is the individual young Ludwig Wittgenstein whom he has in mind', and to suggest that Wittgenstein 'may have inspired … (the) hatred of Jews which led, ultimately, to the Holocaust'. It is exactly this sort of sloppy, irresponsible, 'plausible' style of thought that Wittgenstein's philosophy, by its careful attention to the particular and to not saying more or less than is warranted, is directed against."

Selected reviews
Ray Monk, one of Wittgenstein's biographers, concentrates on the inconsistencies in Cornish's theory that Wittgenstein was the head of the Cambridge spy ring, asking why Cornish has apparently not bothered to verify any of his theories by checking the KGB archives.  Ultimately, Monk says "As I read The Jew of Linz, I found myself wondering how on earth Cornish had confected so strange a piece of work. I found it by turns puzzling, funny, challenging and outrageously nutty... Cornish calls his book 'pioneer detective work', but I think it is really pioneer detective fiction."

Daniel Johnson viewed The Jew of Linz as a "revisionist tract masquerading as psycho-history". He wrote, "Cornish correctly identifies 'the twist of the investigation' as the thesis that 'Nazi metaphysics, as discernible in Hitler's writings... is nothing but Wittgenstein's theory of the mind modified so as to exclude the race of its inventor'. So the Jew of Linz was indirectly responsible, at least in part, for the Holocaust. Cornish tries to deflect the implications of his argument thus: 'Whatever 'the Jews' may have done, nothing humanly justifies what was done to them.' But he then offers 'a thought that might occur to a Hasidic Jew, and that is more fittingly a matter for Jewish, as opposed to gentile, reflection: the very engine that drove Hitler's acquisition of the magical powers that made his ascent and the Holocaust possible was the Wittgenstein Covenant violation'. At this point, the nonsensical shades into the downright sinister.

Sean French wrote in the New Statesman: "There is something heroic about this argument and it would be a good subject for a novel about the dangers of creating theories out of nothing. Vladimir Nabokov should have written it. It is not just that there are weak links in the theory. There are no links in the theory. No evidence that Hitler, in his final unhappy year, even knew a boy two years above him. If they did know each other, there is no evidence that he was the boy Hitler distrusted, no evidence that Hitler's remarks on snitching related to specific incidents at the Linz Realschule, no evidence that Wittgenstein informed on his fellow pupils." In the same journal, Roz Kaveney calls it "a stupid and dishonest book", and says "[Cornish's] intention is to claim Wittgenstein for his own brand of contemplative mysticism, which he defines as the great insight that IndoEuropeans (or, as he unregenerately terms them, Aryans) brought to Hinduism and Buddhism."

Antony Flew offers a mixed review: "Mr Cornish contends that the reason why the government of the USSR treated Wittgenstein with such peculiar generosity was that he had been the recruiter of all the Cambridge spies. The question whether or not this hypothesis is true or false can be definitively settled only if and when the relevant Soviet archives are examined. But I am myself as confident as without such knock-down decisive verification it is possible to be that Mr Cornish is right. On the other hand, 'On the very first page of Part III, Mr Cornish explains that the essence of this doctrine was expressed by Emerson in his restatement of the original Aryan doctrine of consciousness: '… the act of seeing and the thing seen, the see-er and the spectacle, the subject and the object is one'. I confess, not very shamefacedly, that confronted with such doctrines I want to quote Groucho Marx: 'It appears absurd. But don't be misled. It is absurd.'"

German historian Michael Rissmann argues that Cornish overestimates Hitler's intellectual capacities and uses fraudulent talks Hermann Rauschning claims to have had with Hitler to prove Hitler's alleged occultist interest." In Philosophy Now, John Mann argues that the contentions that so riled up the book's many critics were simply a clever ruse by Cornish designed to attract more readers. Mann writes: "Cornish is clever enough to know if he wrote a book on his 'no ownership' theory of language it would not have a wide readership. If he says this 'no ownership' theory was taught by Wittgenstein, learned and twisted for his own ends by Hitler, and actually needs Cornish to explain it all in great detail for the rest of the book he has the book reviewed in every paper and even serialised in the Sunday Times. ... If you’re looking for a book which offers history, politics, magic and philosophy, try The Jew of Linz."

Notes

Further reading

Klagge, James C. (ed.) Wittgenstein: Biography and Philosophy. Cambridge University Press, 2001.
"Magnates and metaphysics", The Economist, 14 March 1998.
 Nearly the entire photo with 41 boys & 1 man

1998 non-fiction books
Books about Adolf Hitler
Books about Ludwig Wittgenstein
English-language books
Pseudohistory
Linz
Jews and Judaism in Austria
20th-century history books
Australian non-fiction books